Lycos Europe was a pan-European network of websites, offering services including communication tools, online communities, web search, e-commerce, web hosting, homepage building and Internet access. It was an independent corporation, sharing no corporate structure with Lycos, Inc. (USA) other than the licensed use of their name in Europe, but Lycos Europe was formed as a joint-venture between Bertelsmann and Telefonica, who owned Lycos Inc. through Terra Lycos. On 26 November 2008, Lycos Europe announced that it was to shut down and sell its remaining assets.

The Winding up of Lycos Europe
In November 2008, Lycos Europe announced that shareholders had called for its liquidation.  Over the following months, it sold as many of its assets as possible and liquidated.  Sold assets included the sale of the Danish portal Jubii, the Lycos Chat (which at the time was both the Lycos & Yahoo Chat in Europe) was transferred to a new operator on March 9, 2009, and for a short while rebranded as the Noesis Chat.  The Lycos Chat now forms part of Lycos, Inc. (USA) collection of sites, Love@Lycos was sold to a Swedish company. Lycos Europe sold further businesses: the news search Paperball was taken over by Paperball GmbH, Munich. The search engine Fireball now belongs to Ambrosia AG, Zug (Switzerland). Trademark and domains of the French Email-Service Caramail were taken over by United Internet AG, Montabaur. Conversis hosting GmbH continues the free hosting service MultiMania. Since liquidation, Lycos Inc withdrew the right for Lycos Europe to use their name and therefore, Lycos Europe are still partially trading under the name Jubii Europe.

Make Love Not Spam
In November 2004, Lycos Europe introduced a Microsoft Windows and Mac OS screensaver program called Make Love Not Spam. It was introduced as both marketing for the then-new Lycos email service Spray Mail, and as a way for users to fight spam in a collective manner.

The program worked using users' computers to perform a DDOS attack on the web servers of known spammers. The computers worked in the same way as a botnet except the users were aware of the software and were able to decide if they wished to be involved in the scheme.

On the December 21, 2004 Lycos Europe stopped distributing the program whilst simultaneously 'turning off' the programs on computers that had downloaded it. The decision was made under heavy criticism from Internet and security experts. It is also believed Lycos was subject to large scale counterattacks believed to be from spammers in retaliation.  The distribution website was replaced with the words "Stay Tuned".

References

External links 
 Lycos UK
 Lycos, Inc. (USA)
 Lycos Chat (UK)

Joint ventures
Companies based in the London Borough of Merton

fi:Makelovenotspam.com